Jackson Township is a township in Newton County, Arkansas, United States. Its total population was 1,620 as of the 2010 United States Census, an increase of 1.76 percent from 1,592 at the 2000 census.

According to the 2010 Census, Jackson Township is located at  (36.002703, -93.180608).

The city of Jasper is located within the township.

References

External links 

Townships in Arkansas
Populated places in Newton County, Arkansas